Agnimala is a 1975 Telugu language novel by Indian author Dasari Subrahmanyam.  It was serialised in the magazine Yuva, and was published as a book in 2011.

Background
In 1964, the previous serials in 'Chandamama' have been replaced by Bengali serials like 'Durgesha Nandidni', 'Nawab Nandini'. Challenged by this incident author, Dasari Subrahmanyam wrote the novel Agnimala with the background of kingdoms, kings, queens, and wars. But this never appeared in Chandamama instead it got published as a serial in Yuva magazine from same publication.

The specialty of this story is that politics leads to love and political strategies gets more importance than love. This story starts with the political rivalry between the king of Chandragiri Nava Bhoja and the king Kala Bhoja. While planning to stop the conspiracy of Kala Bhoja, the king of Chandragiri decides to turn the strongest neighbor the king of Mallur, Prasena on his side. Nava Bhoja sends one of his subordinates Avagna Varma, who is  good at trapping the women  to Prasena's kingdom to convince and marry his daughter, So that Prasena will join into his camp. But the cunning Avagna Varma fails to get hand of Prasena's daughter Vakulamala. To escape from this defeat and to keep his good score at the King, Avagna Varma plans to turn the situation onto Agnipala. Even though Agni is a great warrior, he respects his king Nava Bhoja. Due to the inspiration of his friends Obala Raj and Jaya Singh, accepts the bet of Avagna Varma that he can marry the princess Vakulamala. Agni leaves to Prasena's kingdom with his personal guard Mahu  and other subordinates. On the way they meet Vishnumitra, the subordinate of Kala Bhoja and receives some letters. The injured Vishnumitra requests Agni to pass the letters to his love and loses consciousness without telling the name of his love. He assumes that Vishnumitra is dead and searches for a village by losing the way. On separating from the troop, he reaches to Prasena's palace. Going through the letters which Agni has got from Vishnumitra, Prasena and others assumes that he is Vishnumitra and gives shelter. As time passes Vakulamala loves Agni. Because of this, Vakulamala's Uncle Betalavarma, one who wishes to marry her, tries to take revenge on Agni and Prasena. Later Vakulamala learns about the true colors of Vishnumitra from Manimanta, the father of Vishnumitra's love. With broken heart she informs Nava Bhoja's guards to arrest  the culprit Vishnumitra assuming that Agni as Vishnumitra. The guards arrest Agni.

Meanwhile, in Chandragiri, Nava Bhoja appoints Avagna Varma as the judge of Manukota's law court. With the chance of judging Agnipal, he gives the judgement to hang agni. Nava Bhoja realizes the truth from Obala Raj and sends Jaya Singh to rescue Agnipal. Later Agniapal rescues the king Prasena from the culprit Betalavarma and marries Vakulamala by expressing his love.

Published by                       :  Vahini book trust and Manchipustakam
Total Pages                        :  154
Book Price                         :  Rs.60/-
Paintings&Illustrations            :  Vaddadi Papaiah
Preface                            :  'Rachana'Shai and Vasundhara.

2011 Indian novels
Novels first published in serial form
Works originally published in Indian magazines